One Campus Martius is a building located in downtown Detroit, Michigan. It began construction in 2000 and was finished in 2003. It has seventeen floors in total, fifteen above-ground, and two below-ground, and has  of office space. The high-rise was built as an office building with a restaurant, retail units, space for Compuware and  a fitness center, as well as an atrium. The building now has Rocket Mortgage, Microsoft, Meridian Health, Plante Moran and Compuware as its major tenants.

The building was constructed in the late-modernist architectural style, using glass, granite and limestone as its main materials. AIA Detroit's Urban Priorities Committee rated the building's entry as one of the top ten Detroit interiors.

History
The building sits on the Kern Block which was once home to the Kern Department store. The store had existed in some form or another on this site since 1900. The last incarnation of the store was demolished in 1966, and the area remained greenspace until 1999 when Campus Martius Park began to take shape. Compuware moved its headquarters and 4,000 employees to a newly constructed building on the site in 2003. Quicken Loans agreed to a five-year lease agreement to move its headquarters and 1,700 employees to the building in 2010. Plante Moran followed suit with a lease agreement in 2013, deciding to move 75 employees to the building.

Compuware's presence in the building has lessened as it has downsized during the 2010s, and the company now has around 800 employees in the building. The building was sold in a joint venture to Dan Gilbert's real estate group Bedrock Real Estate and Meridian Health for $142 Million in November 2014. As part of the deal Quicken Loans took an additional floor bringing its space in the building to 300,000 sq. ft. Meridian moved 700 team members into the building in spring 2015 with 1700 employees expected by the end of the year. Compuware's remaining employees will stay in the building.

Description
The lobby contains what is said to be the world's tallest indoor water sculpture.

Parking garage
This 3,000-space parking structure stands 45-meter tall with 12-stories (2 underground floors). The One Campus Martius Garage is home to the Cadillac Center Station on the Detroit People Mover route.

Gallery

References

Further reading

External links

One Campus Campus Martius - Bedrock Real Estate Services 
Downtown Detroit photo gallery
Compuware official website

Google Maps location of Compuware World Headquarters
Construction footage from 2002

Skyscraper office buildings in Detroit
Downtown Detroit
Information technology company headquarters in the United States
Office buildings completed in 2003
2003 establishments in Michigan
Rock Ventures
Postmodern architecture in the United States